The 38th New Brunswick Legislative Assembly represented New Brunswick between March 5, 1936, and October 24, 1939.

Murray MacLaren served as Lieutenant-Governor of New Brunswick.

Hedley F. G. Bridges was chosen as speaker.

The Liberal Party led by Allison Dysart formed the government.

History

Members 

Notes:

References 
 Canadian Parliamentary Guide, 1939, AL Normandin

Terms of the New Brunswick Legislature
1935 establishments in New Brunswick
1939 disestablishments in New Brunswick
20th century in New Brunswick